Revere is a city in Suffolk County, Massachusetts, located approximately  from downtown Boston. Founded as North Chelsea in 1846, it was renamed in 1871 after Revolutionary War patriot Paul Revere. In 1914, the Town of Revere was incorporated as a city. As of the 2020 United States Census, the city has a population of 62,186 inhabitants.

Geography 
Revere borders the towns of Winthrop and Chelsea, and the Boston neighborhood of East Boston to the south, Everett and Malden to the west, Saugus and Lynn to the north, and the Atlantic Ocean to the east.

Neighborhoods and districts 
Revere is home to several distinct neighborhoods and districts:

Beachmont: Beachmont is Revere's most easterly neighborhood, situated between Revere Beach Boulevard and East Boston's Orient Heights. It is home to a diverse ethnic population and a mixture of single and multi-family homes, apartments, and local businesses.

Broadway: Broadway is Revere's central civic, commercial, and travel artery. It is home to a variety of small businesses, residences, and public buildings like Revere City Hall. It is accessible from all sides of the city and is a popular route for those traveling to neighboring municipalities like Saugus, Lynn, and Chelsea.

Oak Island: Oak Island is located near the Point of Pines and the end of Revere Beach. It is primarily home to single and multi-family homes and neighbors Revere's marsh and wetlands.

Point of Pines: Point of Pines is located at the end of Revere Beach and is primarily home to single and multi-family homes. Residents of the Point of Pines neighborhood have access to their own private portion of Revere Beach.

Revere Beach Boulevard: Revere Beach Boulevard runs directly along Revere Beach. It is home to a mixture of apartment complexes, restaurants, and single-family homes. New development along the beach has also brought the rise of luxury apartments and fine-dining restaurants to the district.

Revere Street: Connecting Broadway to Revere Beach, Revere Street is a main travel artery for those commuting across both sides of the city. It is home to a number of local businesses restaurants, barbershops, and convenience stores.

Shirley Avenue: The Shirley Avenue neighborhood has a long history of welcoming Revere's immigrant populations. Over time, it has been home to the has been home to the city's Jewish, European, Latin American, African, and Cambodian communities. It is the most ethnically diverse part of the city and is home to various ethnic grocery stores, restaurants, and community services.

West Revere: West Revere primarily consists of single and multi-family homes. Aside from residential development, West Revere is also home to the Squire Road business district which contains a mixture of large shopping plazas, restaurants, and hotels.

History 

Revere's first inhabitants were Native Americans who belonged to the Pawtucket tribe and were known to colonists as the Rumney Marsh Indians.

The Rumney Marsh was named by the English after Romney Marsh in Kent, England. Nanepashemet, known to colonists as "Sagamore George," was the leader, or Great Sachem of the Pawtucket Confederation of Abenaki People of Lynn (which at that time included present day Revere). Nanepashemet is thought to have sometimes lived near the Rumney Marsh. One branch of his family took "Rumney Marsh" as their surname.

In 1616, an epidemic, probably smallpox, swept the region, killing thousands in its wake. Nanepashemet retired to the Mystic River, in what is now Medford, but was found murdered in 1619 at his fort on the brow of Rock Hill overlooking the river. Three sons succeeded him in his reign. One of them, Wonohaquaham, also called "Sagamore John," had jurisdiction over the Native Americans at Winnisemmit (later Chelsea) and Rumney Marsh.

In 1624, Samuel Maverick became the first colonist to settle in the area. He built his house at the site of the former Chelsea Naval Hospital (or Admiral's Hill). On June 17, 1630, John Winthrop, the first Governor of the Massachusetts Bay Company in New England joined him there for dinner.

On September 25, 1634, Rumney Marsh was annexed to Boston, which had received its name only four years earlier. Winnisemmet (current Chelsea) and Pullen Point (current Winthrop) were also annexed to Boston.

Rumney Marsh was originally divided and allotted to twenty-one of Boston's most prominent citizens. By 1639, the original allotments had been consolidated into seven great farms. Farming was the principal industry of Winnisemmet, and Rumney Marsh in particular.

The first county road in North America stretched across Rumney Marsh from the Winnisemmet Ferry to Olde Salem in 1641.

During King Philip's War (also known as Metacomet's War), which lasted from 1675 to 1678, the local Native Americans were forcibly removed to what is now Deer Island, where half of those imprisoned died of starvation or exposure. Some were enlisted to help the colonists defeat other native tribes.

In 1739, Rumney Marsh, Winnisemmet and Pullen Point were set off from Boston and established as the Town of Chelsea. The largest of the three settlements, Rumney Marsh (later to become North Chelsea) was selected as the Town Center.

In 1775, the area played a role in the American Revolution as Rumney Marsh was the site of the first naval battle.

In 1846, the town of North Chelsea was established. In 1852, Pullen Point seceded from North Chelsea and was established as the town of Winthrop. That same year, Chelsea became its own city. On March 24, 1871, a petition went into effect, changing the name of North Chelsea to the Town of Revere in honor of Paul Revere (1735–1818), the son of an immigrant who took part in the American Revolutionary War. Revere had gained popularity after the publication of Henry Wadsworth Longfellow's 1860 poem "Paul Revere's Ride".

In 1914, the Town of Revere became the City of Revere.

21st century 
On the morning of July 28, 2014, an EF2 tornado touched down in nearby Chelsea and intensified as it entered the city of Revere, causing major damage to many buildings, including the Revere City Hall. It was the first tornado to hit Suffolk County since the National Weather Service began keeping records in 1950.

Demographics 

As of the 2019 American Community Survey 5-Year Estimates, there were 53,692 people living in the city. The racial makeup of the city was 78.1% White, 5.5% Black, 4.9% Asian, 0.3% Native American, 0% Pacific Islander, 6.0% some other race, and 5.3% multiracial. Those of Hispanic or Latino origin made up 33.6% of the population (9.4% Salvadoran, 8.3% Colombian, 3.8% Puerto Rican, 2.3% Guatemalan, 2.0% Dominican, 1.9% Honduran, and 1.3% Mexican).

There were 19,223 households and 12,196 families living in the city. Of the households, 43.8% had children under the age of 18, 42.0% were headed by married couples living together, 14.6% had a female householder with no husband present, 6.9% had a male householder with no wife present, and 36.6% were non-families. 28.1% of all households were made up of individuals, and 13.4% had someone living alone who was 65 years of age or older. The average household size was 2.78 and the average family size was 3.41.

The age distribution of the population had 20.1% under the age of 18, 7.2% from 18 to 24, 31.6% from 25 to 44, 26.7% from 45 to 64, and 14.4% who were 65 years of age or older. The median age was 39.2 years. For every 100 females, there were 101.3 males. For adults 18 and over, for every 100 females there were 95.9 males.

The median household income in the city was $62,568, and the median family income was $72,656. Males had a median income of $36,881 versus $31,300 for females. The per capita income for the city was $30,587. About 10.2% of families and 12.7% of the population were below the poverty line, including 17.9% of those under age 18 and 13.3% of those age 65 or over.

Following the 2020 United States Census, Revere became the fastest growing city in Massachusetts.

Climate

In a typical year, Revere, Massachusetts, temperatures fall below 50F° for 184 days per year. Annual precipitation is typically 43.4 inches per year (high in the US) and snow covers the ground 0 days per year or 0% of the year (the lowest in the US). It may be helpful to understand the yearly precipitation by imagining 9 straight days of moderate rain per year. The humidity is below 60% for approximately 34.4 days or 9.4% of the year.

Immigrant population

1600s–1800s 

"In 1637 the Massachusetts General Court adopted an order that no person or town should receive or entertain a newcomer for more than three weeks without permission. In addition to the desire to keep their colony Puritan, they were also concerned with the immigration of paupers. In subsequent years a law was passed that restricted the immigration of 'lame, impotent, or infirmed persons.' Hardly any immigrants came to Massachusetts during the second half of the 17th century."

English immigration came to a near-complete stop in 1642 as a result of the English Civil War, but was replaced with immigration from other European countries.

In 1687, only 31 people lived in the settlements of Winnisimmit, Rumney Marsh, and Pullen Point. In 1739, when these settlements were separated from Boston and formed the Town of Chelsea, there were 10 homes in Winnisimmit (Chelsea), 26 in Rumney Marsh (Revere), and 4 homes in Pullen Point (Winthrop), with 267 inhabitants in total. This number quadrupled by 1837, at which time 1,201 people resided on the land.

Rumney Marsh Burying Ground in Revere contains the graves of 16 formerly enslaved Black people; a plaque there lists their names, dates of death, and approximate ages.

Second wave 

Between 1837 and 1840, the population nearly doubled due to the second major wave of immigration into the area.

"During this period of time more than 750,000 Irish, British and German immigrants arrived in America; and another 4.3 million immigrants came from these countries during the next 20 years. Of the total number of immigrants to America during the second wave, 40 percent were from Ireland, escaping poverty and famine in their native country."

Third wave 

"By 1905 the Italian population in Revere had grown large enough that the first Italian Catholic Parish of Saint Anthony of Padua was founded in a three-family dwelling on Revere Street. It was clear in 1905 that the Italian population of Revere was rapidly becoming the fastest growing ethnic group in the town."

At this time, "only 19 percent of the immigrants entering the U.S. were from northern Europe, while 81 percent were from southern, eastern, and central Europe," and "nearly 60 percent of the births in the Town of Revere were to foreign born parents."

Jewish immigration 

The first Jewish residents of Revere were Russian and Polish immigrants, of whom there were 137 in 1885 and 1,646 by 1915.

Revere's first Jewish congregation was established in 1906, when the Temple B’Nai Israel was founded. The second was established ten years later when "Congregation Tiffereth Israel purchased the Methodist Episcopal Society's church at the corner of Shirley and Nahant Avenue."

In 1940, Jewish residents accounted for about 25% of the City of Revere's population.

"Most of the Jews in Revere were concentrated around Shirley Avenue, which was the center of activity at that time.  With Jewish businesses, synagogues and kosher markets, it represented the vibrancy of Jewish life, faith and culture in Revere.  On Saturday night, all of the Jewish-owned businesses on Shirley Ave. would reopen after Shabbat and the streets would once again be filled with the vibrancy of Jewish life at that time."

21st century 

As of 2000, the city had the 19th highest percentage of Brazilians in the U.S. (tied with Sea Ranch Lakes, Florida, and Malden, Massachusetts) at 1.7% of the population.

As of 2010, 27% of the residents of Revere were born outside of the United States. Many of them originate from North Africa, Asia, Europe, and Latin America. The 2010 percentage of foreign born residents is twice that of 1990.

In May 2017, the city was host to its first Moroccan Cultural Day celebration, which took place on Shirley Avenue. The city's Moroccan community was estimated to account for at least 10% of the population, as of May 2019. Following the outbreak of the coronavirus pandemic, the community organization, "Moroccan American Connections in Revere" (MACIR) supplied the city with hand-made protective masks.

Government

Local 
The City of Revere elects a mayor, city council, and school committee. The mayor is elected to a four-year term and also serves as chair of the school committee. The current Mayor of Revere is Brian Arrigo. Mayor Arrigo is currently serving his second four year-term, which began in 2020. The Revere City Council is made up of eleven members, five at-large councillors and six ward councillors. Revere also elects its own school committee, which is made up of seven members total.

State 
Revere has two representatives in the Massachusetts House of Representatives and one in the Massachusetts Senate. State Representatives Jessica Giannino, Sixteenth Suffolk District, and Jeffrey Turco, Nineteenth Suffolk District, represent Revere in the House. State Senator Lydia Edwards, First Suffolk and Middlesex District, represents Revere in the Senate.

Economy

Economic development 
In 2018, the City of Revere announced the launch of 'Next Stop, Revere' the city's first comprehensive master plan in over 40 years, in partnership with the Metropolitan Area Planning Council. 'Next Stop, Revere' involved input from residents, officials, and community partners, and outlined a vision for the next 10–20 years of the city's future. A main focal point of this plan involved economic development. A number of goals were outlined including developing Revere's workforce, supporting small businesses, attracting science and technology industries, supporting industry, and supporting local entrepreneurs.

Employment 
According to the City of Revere's 2021 Budget proposed by the Mayor's Office, the top employers in the city are:

Sites of interest

Revere Beach 

Revere Beach is the oldest public beach in the United States. It has a fairly active beach front district. From its inception, Revere Beach was used mostly by the working class and the many immigrants who settled in the area. The Revere Beach Reservation Historic District was listed on the National Register of Historic Places in 1998, including the full Revere Beach Reservation in 2003.

The Beach began to deteriorate in the 1950s and by the early 1970s it had become a strip of bars and abandoned buildings. The Great Blizzard of 1978 proved to be the final death knell for the "old" Revere Beach, as many of the remaining businesses, amusements, pavilions, sidewalks, and much of the seawall were destroyed.

The area once boasted an extensive array of amusement rides and attractions. The Whip, the Ferris wheel, Bluebeard's Palace, the Fun House, Hurley's Dodgems, the Pit, Himalaya, Hippodrome, Sandy's, the Wild Mouse, the Virginia Reel and many more provided hours of enjoyment for residents and visitors alike. The biggest attraction was the Cyclone, among the largest roller coasters in the United States. Also notable was the Derby Racer racing roller coaster, which had a series of accidents that killed or critically injured riders between 1911 and 1936. Lightning was another roller coaster at Revere Beach, and was a member of Harry Traver's infamous "Terrifying Triplets". In addition, there were two roller skating rinks, two bowling alleys, and numerous food stands. There were also ballrooms, including the most famous, the Oceanview and the Beachview, each the site of many dance marathons which were popular in the 1930s.

The Beach was the focus of a major revitalization effort by the Massachusetts Department of Conservation and Recreation and the City in the 1980s and was officially reopened in May 1992. It now boasts high-rise housing units, a re-sanded beach, restored pavilions, and a renovated boulevard. Revere commemorated the centennial of the first opening of Revere Beach on the weekend of July 19, 1996.

Rumney Marsh Reservation 

The Rumney Marsh is a Massachusetts state park occupying 600 acres within Revere and the town of Saugus.

Historic places 

Revere has eight places on the National Register of Historic Places.

Kelly's Roast Beef 

Kelly's Roast Beef is a fast food eatery founded in Revere in 1951. Its main location is along the Revere Beach shoreline. Kelly's claims to have invented the modern roast beef sandwich, saying it was unknown as such before they introduced it in 1951.

St. Anthony's of Padua 

St. Anthony's was the city's first national Italian Parish. The church was first built across the street from its current location, the site of today's Friendly Garden, in 1906. The site of a larger church was constructed in 1924, the first mass of the new church was offered in 1926. Its current structure was completed in 1943.

Necco 

Considered the oldest continuously operating candy company in the United States at the time of its 2018 closure, Necco was best known for its namesake candy, Necco Wafers, its seasonal Sweethearts Conversation Hearts, and brands such as the Clark Bar and Haviland Thin Mints. The company maintained headquarters at 135 American Legion Highway in Revere, where it offered tours of the facilities.

Wonderland Greyhound Park 

Wonderland Greyhound Park was a greyhound racing track located in the city owned by the Westwood Group. It was constructed on the site of the former Wonderland Amusement Park. Wonderland opened on June 12, 1935, and formerly offered 361 performances during its 100-day, April to September racing period. Parimutuel wagering was legalized by the Massachusetts Legislature in 1934. The Park opened the following year and offered greyhound racing from June 1935 until September 2009. It ran its last program on September 18, 2009, as a result of a statewide referendum that banned greyhound racing. The future of the land is uncertain.

Revere Post Office 

From 1934 to 1943 murals were produced in the United States through the Section of Painting and Sculpture, later called the Section of Fine Arts, of the Treasury Department. The intended purpose of the murals was to boost the morale of the American people from the effects of the Depression. Competitions that determined commissioned works were open to all artists in the United States. division. Muralist Ross Moffett painted the mural The First Store and Tavern in 1939 at the U.S. Post Office in Revere.

Transportation 
The completion in 1838 of the Eastern Railroad (later the Boston & Maine), and in 1875 of the Boston, Revere Beach & Lynn Railroad, signaled the beginning of rapid population growth for the town and the development of the beach as a summer resort. By 1885, ten years later, the town had increased to 3,637 inhabitants, more than tripling in size over 15 years. By 1890, the population had grown to 5,668.

In 1871, Revere was the site of The Great Revere Train Wreck of 1871, the deadliest railroad incident in Massachusetts history up to that point, when the Eastern Railroad's "Portland Express" slammed into the back of a stopped local commuter train at Revere Station.

The MBTA Blue Line terminates in Revere, with stops at Wonderland, Revere Beach, and Beachmont.

U.S. Route 1 and state highways
1A,
16,
60,
107, and
145 run through Revere.

Education 

Revere Public Schools operates the city's public schools. High school students attend either the Revere High School, Northeast Metropolitan Regional Vocational High School or the Seacoast School. Some students attend local charter schools in other cities such as the Pioneer Charter School of Science. There are three public middle schools: the Garfield School, Susan B. Anthony Middle School, and the Rumney Marsh Academy. Private Pre-K–8 schools include Eagle Heights Academy and Immaculate Conception.

Notable people 

 Horatio Alger Jr., author
 Elliot Aronson, psychologist
 Ray Barry, ice hockey player
 Elizabeth Bishop, poet
 John Cazale, actor
 Robin Christopher, actress
 Billy Conigliaro, professional baseball player
 Tony Conigliaro, professional baseball player
 Glenn Danzig, singer-songwriter
 James DeAngelis, comedian, actor, and YouTuber
 Adio diBiccari, sculptor
 Jim Del Gaizo, professional football player
 Michael 'M-Dot' Januario, musician
 Gerald Jordan, businessman
 Bill Macy, actor
 Joseph Malta, soldier
 Gino Martino, professional wrestler
 Roland Merullo, author
 Zack Norman, actor, producer, and financier
 James Porter, pedophile
 James Sokolove, attorney
 Beverly Swerling, novelist
 Henry Waitt, cigar manufacturer

Sister city 
Mayor Brian Arrigo signed a sister city agreement on Tuesday, August 2, 2016, with Former Mayor Shoji Nishida of Date City, Fukushima.

References

External links 

 Official website
 Revere Chamber of Commerce
 Revere Society for Cultural and Historic Preservation

 
1630 establishments in Massachusetts
Cities in Massachusetts
Cities in Suffolk County, Massachusetts
Paul Revere
Populated coastal places in Massachusetts
Populated places established in 1630